Kerryn (van Zyl) Hulsen (born 5 October 1974) is a retired South African hurdler who specialized in the 400 metres hurdles.

In the hurdles she competed at the 2001 Summer Universiade without reaching the final, and finished fifth at the 2003 All-Africa Games. At the same games she won a silver medal in the 4 × 100 metres relay.

Her personal best time was 56.19 seconds, achieved in April 2002 in Germiston.

References

External links

1974 births
Living people
South African female hurdlers
African Games silver medalists for South Africa
African Games medalists in athletics (track and field)
Athletes (track and field) at the 2003 All-Africa Games
20th-century South African women
21st-century South African women